Tri-County School District or Tri County Schools may refer to:

 Tri-County School District (Arkansas)
 Tri-County School District (Iowa)
 Tri County Area Schools - Michigan
 Tri-County School District (Minnesota)
 Tri County Public Schools - Nebraska